Arepa 3000 is a studio album by acid jazz band Los Amigos Invisibles. It was released in 2000 on Luaka Bop.

Track listing
 "Intro"
 "Arepa 3000"
 "La Vecina"
 "Qué Rico"
 "Cuchi Cuchi"
 "Si Estuvieras Aquí"
 "Masturbation Session"
 "Mami Te Extraño"
 "Mujer Policía"
 "No Le Metas Mano"
 "Amor"
 "Pipí"
 "El Barro"
 "Domingo Echao"
 "Piazo E' Perra"
 "El Baile Del Sobón"
 "Fonnovo"
 "Caliente"
 "Llegaste Tarde"

References

2000 albums
Luaka Bop albums
Los Amigos Invisibles albums